Harry Potter and the Cursed Child is a play written by Jack Thorne, based on an original story written by J. K. Rowling, John Tiffany, and Thorne. The story takes place nineteen years after the events of Harry Potter and the Deathly Hallows. It follows Harry Potter, now Head of the Department of Magical Law Enforcement at the Ministry of Magic, and his son, Albus Severus Potter, who is about to attend his first year at Hogwarts School of Witchcraft and Wizardry. Rowling has referred to the play as "the eighth Harry Potter story".

From its opening, Harry Potter and the Cursed Child has received near universal critical acclaim for its magic, illusions, and stage wizardry. The original West End production premiered at the Palace Theatre on 7 June 2016. It received a record-breaking eleven nominations and won another record-breaking nine awards, including Best New Play, at the 2017 Laurence Olivier Awards. A Broadway production opened at the Lyric Theatre on 21 April 2018. That production received ten nominations and won six awards, including Best Play at the 2018 Tony Awards. An Australian production opened at the Princess Theatre in Melbourne, on 23 February 2019. A second American production opened in San Francisco at the Curran Theatre on 1 December 2019. The first non-English production opened at the Mehr! Theater in Hamburg, Germany, on 5 December 2021. A Canadian production opened at the Ed Mirvish Theatre in Toronto, on 19 June 2022. A Japanese production opened at the TBS Akasaka ACT Theater on 8 July 2022.

The play was originally produced as a two-part play, that could be viewed on the same day (i.e. in the afternoon and in the evening) or over two evenings. In June 2021, the play was re-staged as a single 3.5 hour show for future performances on Broadway in November 2021. In 2022, the San Francisco, Melbourne, Toronto, and Tokyo productions also adopted the one-part play, with Hamburg following in 2023. The West End production is the only location that continues to stage the original two-part play.

Background
In December 2013, it was revealed that a stage play based on the Harry Potter series had been in development for around a year, with the view to bringing it to the stage sometime in 2016. At the time of the announcement, author J. K. Rowling revealed that the play would "explore the previously untold story of Harry's early years as an orphan and outcast". The following May, Rowling began establishing the creative team for the project.

On 26 June 2015, it was revealed it would receive its world premiere in mid-2016 at London's Palace Theatre. The announcement marked the eighteenth anniversary of the publication of the first Harry Potter novel, Harry Potter and the Philosopher's Stone, published on 26 June 1997.

On announcing plans for the project, Rowling stated that the play would not be a prequel. In response to queries regarding the choice of a play rather than a new novel, Rowling stated that she "is confident that when audiences see the play they will agree that it is the only proper medium for the story". Rowling also assured audiences that the play would contain an entirely new story and would not be a rehashing of previously explored content. On 24 September 2015, Rowling announced that the play had been split into two parts. The parts are designed to be viewed on the same day or consecutively over two evenings.

On 23 October 2015, it was confirmed the plays were set nineteen years after the conclusion of the final novel Harry Potter and the Deathly Hallows, and would open at London's Palace Theatre in July 2016. The plays principally follow Harry Potter, now Head of the Department of Magical Law Enforcement, and his younger son, Albus Severus Potter.

Plot
The play is divided in two parts, consisting of two acts each.

Act One
In the opening scene, set during the epilogue of Deathly Hallows in the year 2017, Harry and Ginny Potter send their younger son, Albus Severus, on the Hogwarts Express to begin his first year at Hogwarts. Harry works as the Head of Magical Law Enforcement at the Ministry of Magic, while Ginny is the editor of the sports section of The Daily Prophet. Ron Weasley and Hermione Granger also send their daughter Rose on the train. Hermione is now the Minister for Magic, while Ron manages Weasley's Wizard Wheezes in Diagon Alley alongside his brother George. Aboard the Hogwarts Express, Albus befriends Scorpius Malfoy, the son of Harry's former foil Draco, and his wife, Astoria. In a break with the tradition of Potters being sorted into Gryffindor, Albus is sorted into Slytherin alongside Scorpius.

Both boys are bullied over the next years, with Albus perceived as failing to live up to his parents, and Scorpius being rumoured to be the son of Lord Voldemort. Astoria passes away due to a fatal disease. Albus and Harry drift apart, with Harry being uncertain about how to help Albus. The summer before his fourth year, Albus gets into a fight with Harry, after being given the latter's baby blanket and a love potion from Ron. During the fight, Harry angrily says that he sometimes wishes Albus was not his son, and Albus spills the potion on the blanket.

Harry obtains a prototype of a more powerful version of the Time-Turner, which allows one to travel into the past and change history. Simultaneously, Harry's scar starts hurting again, raising concerns that Voldemort may be returning. Amos Diggory, who is cared for by his niece Delphi, asks Harry to use the Time-Turner to prevent the death of his son, Cedric. After overhearing Harry refuse to help the Diggorys, Albus is inspired to do so and convinces Scorpius to help him. The two escape from the Hogwarts Express to visit Amos, and they team up with Delphi to steal the Time-Turner from Hermione's office, in the Ministry of Magic, while disguised with Polyjuice Potion.

Act Two
As Cedric's death was the result of him winning the Triwizard Tournament alongside Harry, the boys use the Time-Turner to travel back to the first tournament challenge. They disguise themselves as Durmstrang students to sabotage Cedric and prevent his victory. The plan fails, and the disguises cause Hermione to become suspicious of Viktor Krum, a Durmstrang student, and go to the Yule Ball with Ron instead. As a result, Ron never experiences the jealousy fundamental to his relationship with Hermione, and the two never marry. Ron instead falls in love with Padma Patil at the Ball, and Hermione becomes a frustrated professor at Hogwarts. Albus is now in Gryffindor.

Meanwhile, Harry has nightmares about Voldemort. The centaur Bane tells Harry that a "dark cloud" is around Albus. Convinced that Scorpius is a threat to Albus, Harry tries to separate the boys at Hogwarts by attempting to force Headmistress Minerva McGonagall to keep tabs on Albus using the Marauder's Map.

Albus and Scorpius' friendship is destroyed, but the two reconcile after Albus steals Harry's old Invisibility Cloak from Albus's older brother James Sirius. Harry relents after a conversation with Draco and Ginny. Meanwhile, Albus and Scorpius make another attempt to use the Time-Turner to save Cedric, this time by humiliating him during the Triwizard Tournament's second task. When Scorpius returns to the present day, Albus is not with him. Dolores Umbridge reveals that Harry is dead and Voldemort rules the wizarding world.

Act Three
Scorpius discovers that his actions caused Cedric to join the Death Eaters and kill Neville Longbottom, preventing him from killing Nagini and allowing Voldemort to win the Battle of Hogwarts. With Harry now dead, Albus never existed, while Voldemort was able to consolidate power and transform the Ministry of Magic into a dictatorial regime. In the new timeline, Scorpius became a popular Head Boy and Quidditch star, helping the staff and students torment Muggle-borns. Umbridge became the new Headmistress of Hogwarts and patrols the school with Dementors and a revived Inquisitorial Squad, led by Scorpius.

A dark figure called "The Augurey" leads the Ministry of Magic. With the help and sacrifice of alternate Ron, Hermione, and Severus Snape, Scorpius uses the Time-Turner to prevent his and Albus' past actions, and restore the original timeline. Scorpius reunites with Albus, and the two are found by their parents, as well as Ron and Hermione. Harry scolds Albus, but the two begin to reconcile.

Realizing the danger the Time-Turner poses, Scorpius and Albus attempt to destroy it, when they are joined by Delphi. Scorpius notices Delphi's tattoo of an Augurey and realizes she was in charge of the Ministry of Magic in the alternate timeline. Delphi takes them captive, killing a fellow student in the process, and reveals her intention of restoring the alternate timeline.

After Ron states he saw Albus and Scorpius with Delphi, Harry and Draco confront Amos, and discover Delphi had bewitched him into thinking she was his niece. Delphi takes the boys to the final challenge of the Triwizard Tournament, but Albus and Scorpius foil her plans, and Delphi uses the Time-Turner again to travel farther back in time. She inadvertently takes the boys with her, and destroys the Time-Turner to leave them stranded in time.

Searching Delphi's room, Harry, Draco, Ginny, Hermione and Ron discover hidden writing on the walls claiming Delphi is the daughter of Voldemort, and describing a prophecy that will allow Voldemort to return.

Act Four
Albus and Scorpius discover they have been taken back to the night before Harry's parents were killed. They write an invisible message on Harry's baby blanket, knowing in the present, the blanket would become stained with a love potion and expose the message. The message reads: "Dad.Help.Godric's Hollow.311081."

Meanwhile, Draco reveals the Time-Turner was actually a prototype for a perfected model owned by him. After Harry receives the message from the boys, he and his allies use Draco's Time-Turner to travel back in time to save them and stop Delphi. They deduce she intends to convince Voldemort to abandon his attempt to kill Harry, ensuring his survival.

Harry magically disguises himself as Voldemort to distract Delphi; after a struggle, the group subdues her. Rather than killing Delphi, they decide that she will be given a life sentence in Azkaban Prison. Voldemort appears, oblivious to Harry and the group, and they allow the murder of Harry's parents to play out, unwilling to risk altering the future again.

After returning to the present, Delphi is sent to Azkaban. Albus and Scorpius decide to be more active at Hogwarts, with Scorpius expressing interest in trying out for the Slytherin Quidditch Team and asking Rose out on a to be his friend; she encourages the two boys to pursue their romantic feelings for each other. Harry and Albus visit Cedric's grave, with Harry apologising for his role in Cedric's death. Albus comes out to Harry, saying that Scorpius will always be the most important person in his life, to which Harry responds warmly. The play ends with an unspoken reconciliation between father and son as they stand together at the grave.

One Part Revisions
The one-part version of the play, currently playing in Hamburg, Melbourne, New York, Tokyo, and Toronto, had over an hour and a half of content cut from the show to bring the runtime down to 3 hours and 30 minutes, including a 20-minute intermission. The dream sequences involving Young Harry, the Dursleys and Hagrid have all been removed, as well as the conversations Scorpius has with Polly Chapman and Draco in the Dark World. The St Oswald's location has been replaced with Amos Diggory's private residence, and the character of Lily Potter Jr is now only mentioned in the show.

One major change to the characterisation of Albus and Scorpius is a romantic subplot between the two. Instead of Delphi identifying Albus' weakness of friendship on the Quidditch pitch, as it is written in the two part play, she stares down Scorpius and tauntingly says "love". In the penultimate scene, instead of asking Rose out on a date, Scorpius asks her to be his friend, and she encourages the two boys to pursue their romantic feelings for each other. Finally, as they visit the cemetery, Albus comes out to Harry, saying that Scorpius will always be the most important person in his life, to which Harry responds warmly. These changes have since been reflected in the two part version of the play.

Productions

Harry Potter and the Cursed Child, a two-part play, was written by British playwright Jack Thorne based on an original story by Rowling, John Tiffany, and Thorne. Some websites listed all three as authors of the script, but by 26 July 2016, the official website for the play and many others were listing Thorne as the sole script writer.

The play is directed by Tiffany with choreography by Steven Hoggett, set design by Christine Jones, costume design by Katrina Lindsay, lighting design by Neil Austin, music by Imogen Heap, and sound design by Gareth Fry. In addition, special effects were created by Jeremy Chernick, with illusions by Jamie Harrison, and musical supervision by Martin Lowe.

The producers and Rowling have maintained a campaign called #KeepTheSecrets to ask people who have seen the play not to reveal its major twists. The slogan is printed on the tickets for the play and badges with the slogan are handed out for free during intervals. People buying their tickets online are emailed a video after the play from J.K. Rowling asking them to support the campaign.

West End (2016–present)

On 26 June 2015, it was announced that Harry Potter and the Cursed Child would make its world premiere at the Palace Theatre in the West End.

Tickets went on sale to preregistered priority members on 28 October 2015, before going on sale to the public on 30 October 2015. In just under 8 hours of priority booking, 175,000 tickets were sold for the world premiere production. To meet the demand for tickets, the play's booking period was extended through January 2017. Upon tickets being made available to the general public, an extension was announced through 30 April 2017. On the same day, another extension was announced, this time through 27 May 2017.

On 20 December 2015, initial casting was announced with Jamie Parker playing Harry Potter, Noma Dumezweni playing Hermione Granger and Paul Thornley playing Ron Weasley. The casting of the dark-skinned Noma Dumezweni as Hermione sparked controversy, with Rowling responding that Hermione's skin was never specified as white. Further notable casting included Poppy Miller as Ginny Potter, Alex Price as Draco Malfoy, Sam Clemmett as Albus Potter and Anthony Boyle as Scorpius Malfoy. The original production featured an overall cast of 42 actors.

Previews for Harry Potter and the Cursed Child began at the Palace Theatre on 7 June 2016. The official opening night for the play was on 30 July 2016. The original cast played their final performances on 24 May 2017.

On 16 March 2020, performances were suspended because of the COVID-19 pandemic. Performances resumed on 14 October 2021, continuing as the original two-part production.

Broadway (2018–present)

On 4 May 2017, it was announced that Harry Potter and the Cursed Child would premiere on Broadway at the Lyric Theatre. In preparation for the play, the Lyric Theatre underwent extensive renovations, which included removing 400 seats from the auditorium and moved the entrance to 43rd Street. The New York Times estimated that it was the most expensive non-musical Broadway play ever, incurring approximately $68 million in opening costs. Tickets initially went on sale on 18 October 2017.

On 2 August 2017, the original Broadway cast was announced. Each of the principal West End cast members transferred to Broadway, which included Jamie Parker (Harry Potter), Noma Dumezweni (Hermione Granger), Paul Thornley (Ron Weasley), Poppy Miller (Ginny Potter), Alex Price (Draco Malfoy), Sam Clemmett (Albus Potter), and Anthony Boyle (Scorpius Malfoy). The production began previews on 16 March 2018, before an official opening night on 22 April 2018. The play set a record for the highest-grossing week for a non-musical play in Broadway history, grossing $2,525,850 for the week ending 30 December 2018.

In March 2019, the second-year cast was announced, which included James Snyder as Harry Potter, Jenny Jules as Hermione Granger, Matt Mueller as Ron Weasley, Diane Davis as Ginny Potter, Jonno Roberts as Draco Malfoy, Nicholas Podany as Albus Potter, Nadia Brown as Rose Granger-Weasley, and Bubba Weiler as Scorpius Malfoy.

On 12 March 2020, performances were suspended due to the COVID-19 pandemic. The play re-opened on 12 November 2021, as the newly revised one-part version. In January 2022, Snyder was fired from the production following a misconduct investigation that arose from a complaint raised by Davis, who portrayed Ginny Potter. The play broke its own record for the highest weekly gross by a non-musical play in Broadway history, grossing $2,671,191 for the eight-performance week ending 1 January 2023.

Melbourne (2019–present)

On 24 October 2017, it was announced that Harry Potter and the Cursed Child would make its Australian premiere at the Princess Theatre in Melbourne. In anticipation of the play, the Princess Theatre underwent an estimated $6.5 million renovation to create a more immersive "magical" and theatrical experience for the audience. Presale tickets were released on 2 August 2018, selling more than 200,000 tickets in just four days, before the public sale tickets were released.

On 2 September 2018, the cast was announced. It starred Gareth Reeves as Harry Potter, Paula Arundell as Hermione Granger, Gyton Grantley as Ron Weasley, Lucy Goleby as Ginny Potter, Eva Rees as Albus Potter, Tom Wren as Draco Malfoy, and William McKenna as Scorpius Malfoy.

Performances began on 18 January 2019, ahead of an official opening night on 23 February 2019. However, on 16 March 2020, performances were suspended due to the COVID-19 pandemic. Performances resumed on 25 February 2021. Most of the original principal cast members returned, with Ben Walter joining the show as Albus Potter and Aisha Aidara joining as Rose Granger-Weasley.

On 27 March 2022, the final performance of the original two-part play was performed in Melbourne. Following a brief hiatus, the play reopened on 4 May 2022, as the newly staged one-part version. The lone notable cast change was Lachlan Woods joining the cast as Draco Malfoy.

The Melbourne production will close on 9 July 2023, after approximately 1,300 performances. It had a record-breaking run, with it being the longest running stage play in Australia and the most tickets sold for any stage play in Australia.

San Francisco (2019–2022)
On 28 June 2018, it was announced that the play would open at the Curran Theatre in San Francisco, California, marking the second production of the play in the United States. Tickets went on sale in March 2019, with the demand crashing the ticketing systems. For the week ending Sunday, December 29, 2019, the production grossed $2,096,686 setting a record for the highest-grossing week for a play in San Francisco history.

On 2 August 2019, the cast was announced and starred John Skelley as Harry Potter, Yanna McIntosh as Hermione Granger, David Abeles as Ron Weasley, Angela Reed as Ginny Potter, Lucas Hall as Draco Malfoy. Rounding out the lead cast was Benjamin Papac as Albus Potter, Jon Steiger as Scorpius Malfoy, and Folami Williams as Rose Granger-Weasley. Preview performances began on 23 October 2019, ahead of an official opening night on 1 December 2019.

In response to the emergence of the COVID-19 pandemic, it was announced that the Curran Theatre would be temporarily reducing its capacity to 1,000 patrons. However, on 11 March 2020, it was announced that all performances were suspended because of the COVID-19 pandemic. On 9 February 2022, the play reopened, this time as the newly staged one-part version. Most of the lead cast members reprised their roles, alongside new cast members Steve O’Connell as Ron Weasley, Lily Mojekwu as Hermione Granger, and Abbi Hawk as Ginny Potter.

The San Francisco production of Harry Potter and the Cursed Child closed on 11 September 2022, following 393 performances.

Hamburg (2021–present)

On 5 July 2018, it was announced that the play would make its German premiere at the Mehr! Theater in Hamburg. Titled Harry Potter und das verwunschene Kind (“Harry Potter and the enchanted child”), this marked the first non-English production of the play. The two-part play was originally scheduled to open on 13 March 2020, but was postponed due to the COVID-19 pandemic.

Pre-sale tickets for the play began on 25 March 2019. Extensive renovations for the German production began in May 2019, at an estimated cost of 42 million euros. The cast included Markus Schöttl as Harry Potter, Sebastian Witt as Ron Weasley, Jillian Anthony as Hermione Granger, Sarah Schütz as Ginny Weasley, and Alen Hodzovic as Draco Malfoy. The cast also included Vincent Lang as Albus Potter, Mathias Reiser as Scorpius Malfoy, and Madina Frey as Rose Granger-Weasley.

The German production opened on 5 December 2021. On 8 January 2023, the final performances of the two-part version of the play were performed in Hamburg. The play re-opened on 9 February 2023, as the revised one-part play.

Toronto (2022–present)

On 22 May 2019, it was announced that Harry Potter and the Cursed Child would make its Canadian premiere at the Ed Mirvish Theatre in Toronto. The two-part play was scheduled to open in Fall 2020, but was delayed due to the COVID-19 pandemic.

On 28 August 2021, it was announced that the production will now make its Canadian premiere on 31 May 2022 as the newly staged one-part version. The Ed Mirvish Theatre underwent significant renovations, which cost an estimated $5 million. The renovations transformed the lobby areas and the auditorium to immerse the audience once they enter the theatre, and to provide audiences with a "more magical space".

The Canadian cast was announced on 19 October 2021 and included Trevor White as Harry Potter, Gregory Prest as Ron Weasley, Sarah Afful as Hermione Granger, Trish Lindstrom as Ginny Potter, and Brad Hodder as Draco Malfoy. Other lead cast members included Luke Kimball as Albus Potter, Hailey Alexis Lewis as Rose Granger-Weasley, and Thomas Mitchell Barnet as Scorpius Malfoy.

The production began previews on 31 May 2022, with an official opening night on 19 June 2022. The play set a Canadian weekly box office record for a non-musical play, grossing an estimated $2 million in sales.

Tokyo (2022–present)

On 13 February 2020, it was announced that the production would have its Asian premiere at the TBS Akasaka ACT Theater in Tokyo, Japan. Renovations of the TBS Akasaka ACT Theater began in 2021, which was being re-designed to be "a site-specific venue for Harry Potter and the Cursed Child", and would re-open in time for the theatre's 70th anniversary

The cast for the Tokyo production was announced on 26 January 2022, and would include multiple actors splitting each of the lead roles. The cast starred Tatsuya Fujiwara, Kanji Ishimaru, and Osamu Mukai sharing the role of Harry Potter, Masahiro Ehara and Hayata Tateyama as Ron Weasley, Aoi Nakabeppu and Seina Sagiri as Hermione Granger, Erika Mabuchi and Yuri Shirahane as Ginny Weasley, and Shinya Matsuda and Syuntaro Miyao as Draco Malfoy. Additionally, the cast included Haru Fujita and Kouhei Fukuyama as Albus Potter, and Soudai Kadota and Rio Saitou as Scorpius Malfoy.

The production began previews on 16 June 2022, and had their opening night on 8 July 2022.

Cast and principal roles

London replacements
Harry Potter: Jamie Glover, Jamie Ballard, Jim Fish
Ron Weasley: Thomas Aldridge
Hermione Granger: Rakie Ayola, Michelle Gayle
Ginny Potter: Emma Lowndes
Draco Malfoy: James Howard

New York replacements
Harry Potter: James Snyder, Steve Haggard
Hermione Granger: Jenny Jules
Ron Weasley: Matthew Mueller, David Abeles
Draco Malfoy: Jonno Roberts, Aaron Bartz
Ginny Potter: Dianne Davis, Angela Reed, Erica Sweany
Scorpius Malfoy: Bubba Weiler, Brady Dalton Richards, Erik C. Peterson
Albus Potter: Nicholas Podany, James Romeny

Melbourne replacements
Ron Weasley: Michael Whalley
Draco Malfoy: Lachlan Woods
Ginny Potter: Katie-Jean Harding
Scorpius Malfoy: Nyx Calder
Albus Potter: Ben Walter

Script publication

Editions

Both parts of the stage play's script have been released in print and digital formats as Harry Potter and the Cursed Child – Parts One and Two.

The first edition, the Special Rehearsal Edition, corresponded to the script used in the preview shows and was published on 31 July 2016, the date of Harry's birthday in the series and Rowling's birthday, as well. Since revisions to the script continued after the book was printed, an edited version was released on 25 July 2017, as the "Definitive Collector's Edition". According to CNN, this was the most preordered book of 2016.

Sales 
In the United States and Canada, the book sold over 2 million copies in its first two days of release. 847,885 copies were sold during the book's first week of release in the United Kingdom. By June 2017, the book had sold over 4.5 million copies in the United States.

Critical reception
Harry Potter and the Cursed Child has received critical acclaim. Some audiences and critics have complimented the casting and performances, while many debate the quality of the piece and how it compares to entries in the main Harry Potter series.

Publications awarding five-star ratings included The Independent, the London Evening Standard, The Stage and WhatsOnStage.com. The Telegraph also gave five, although "there are some quibbles," while The Guardian'''s Michael Billington awarded four stars.

Anthony Boyle's performance as Scorpius Malfoy garnered particular acclaim. WhatsOnStage.com wrote that "Boyle gives a career-making performance," while The Wall Street Journal described him as "the break-out performance". Varietys critic, Matt Trueman, agreed, writing, "it's Boyle who really stands out", and both Trueman and Henry Hitchings, in the Evening Standard, noted that his performance was sure to be a fan favourite.

Response within the Harry Potter fandom
The response to the play from the Harry Potter fandom was polarizing. 
Fans responded positively to the play and its characters, with Scorpius Malfoy being particularly popular. Some fans commented that the dialogue between the familiar characters was "spot on", celebrating it as a faithful continuation of the books. Others have noted that the play sheds light on some of the relationships between the characters, such as Harry and Dumbledore's. The response had been particularly positive among fans who watched the play on stage.

Some fans, however, said the story seemed more "like a work of fan fiction" and said that it diverged from previously established rules of the universe, criticising the script's characterisation. Some also took issue with the style and plot of the script, complaining that the Time-Turner storylines had already been used, as had Cedric Diggory's death, and that the writers were rehashing old storylines and over-played tropes of the fantasy/sci-fi genre.

Queerbaiting accusations
The stage play's "ambiguously gay" portrayal of the male friendship between Albus Potter and Scorpius Malfoy has been criticized as an example of "queerbaiting", with director John Tiffany stating his belief that it "would not [have] been appropriate" for The Cursed Child to directly address the characters' sexualities.

Awards and nominations
Original London production

 Original New York production 

 Original Melbourne production 

 Original Toronto production 

Possible film adaptation
In July 2016, Warner Bros. Entertainment applied to purchase the rights to Harry Potter and the Cursed Child, leading to speculation that the stage play was going to become a film, despite earlier claims, most notably from Harry Potter creator J. K. Rowling, that a film adaptation was not being made.

In November 2021, Chris Columbus, who previously directed the first two installments of the Harry Potter film series, expressed interest in directing a film adaptation of Harry Potter and the Cursed Child, with the intent of having the main cast members reprise their roles. When The New York Times'' inquired Daniel Radcliffe if he would be ready to return to his role as Harry Potter, he replied that he was not interested in it at the moment, but would not deny the possibility of returning sometime in the future.

References

External links

2016 plays
Fiction set in 1994
Fiction set in 2017
British plays
Fantasy theatre
Laurence Olivier Award-winning plays
Collaborative plays
Sequel plays
Plays set in the 20th century
Plays set in the 21st century
Plays set in England
Plays set in Scotland
Literature about time travel
West End plays
Works based on Harry Potter